Eastern Australia Airlines Pty Ltd is an airline based on the grounds of Sydney Airport in Mascot, New South Wales, Australia. It is a regional domestic airline serving sixteen destinations within Australia under the QantasLink banner. Its main base is Sydney Airport, with a hub at Melbourne Airport.

History 

The airline was established and started operations in 1949. It began in Tamworth as Tamworth Air Taxi Service (shortened to Tamair later on). The name was changed to Eastern Australia Airlines in 1986. Australian Airlines purchased 26% of Eastern Australian Airlines from East-West Airlines in 1988, and the airline became a wholly owned subsidiary in 1991. Qantas purchased Australian Airlines in 1992.

In 2002, Qantas merged its Mildura-based subsidiary Southern Australia Airlines with Eastern, the resulting operation using the Eastern name.

In August 2008 it was announced that Eastern Australia would shortly commence operating 72-seat Bombardier Dash 8 Q400 aircraft on services to regional centres in New South Wales, supplementing services with smaller 50-seat Dash 8s and allowing the removal of 36-seat Dash 8s from service on some routes altogether with the retirement of all 100 series Dash 8s.

In June 2015, Qantas Group chief executive Alan Joyce announced that Eastern Australia would operate regional services in New Zealand, using Jetstar-branded Bombardier Dash 8 turboprops.

In September 2019, Jetstar CEO Garath Evans announced a proposal to withdraw from regional flying in New Zealand. This was followed up by a confirmation in October 2019. Jetstar cited soft demand, higher fuel costs and a loss making operation as reasons for the withdrawal. Following the withdrawal, the five Jetstar-branded Bombardier Dash 8 aircraft were transferred back to Australia.

Destinations 

Eastern Australia Airlines operates services to the following domestic scheduled destinations. Between December 2015 and November 2019 Eastern Australian Airlines operated regional domestic services within New Zealand under the Jetstar brand.

Australia

From Sydney
Albury, New South Wales
Armidale, New South Wales
Bendigo, Victoria
Canberra, Australian Capital Territory
Coffs Harbour, New South Wales
Dubbo, New South Wales
Griffith, New South Wales
Lord Howe Island
Merimbula, New South Wales
Mildura, Victoria
Moree, New South Wales
Orange, New South Wales
Port Macquarie, New South Wales
Tamworth, New South Wales
Toowoomba, Queensland
Wagga Wagga, New South Wales

From Melbourne
Albury, New South Wales
Canberra, Australian Capital Territory
Devonport, Tasmania
Kingscote, South Australia (seasonal)
Launceston, Tasmania
Mildura, Victoria
Mount Gambier, South Australia

From Adelaide
Canberra, Australian Capital Territory
Kingscote, South Australia
Mount Gambier, South Australia
Port Lincoln, South Australia
Whyalla, South Australia

Fleet 
As of August 2019 the Eastern Australia Airlines fleet consists of the following aircraft:

See also
List of airlines of Australia

References

External links

Airlines established in 1949
Australian companies established in 1949
Qantas
Regional airlines
Companies based in Sydney
Airlines of Australia